Beloretsk (Beloret) is a rural locality (a village) in Akberdinsky Selsoviet, Iglinsky District, Bashkortostan, Russia. The population was 46 as of 2010. There is 1 street.

Geography 
Beloretsk is located 56 km southwest of Iglino (the district's administrative centre) by road. Urunda is the nearest rural locality.

References 

Rural localities in Iglinsky District